Andreas Vlachomitros (born 3 July 1997) is a Greek professional footballer who plays as a left winger for Super League 2 club Egaleo.

Career
Born in the Greek capital Athens, Vlachomitros came from the youth ranks of AEK Athens where he scored over 60 goals in four years.  He made his debut for the main team of AEK against Pannaxiakos on the last match day of 2013–14 Football League 2 season, scoring the final 3–1 score with a header.

Vlachomitros made his professional debut against Panionios at a UEFA playoff match in the last game of the 2015–16 season.

On July 7, 2016, Vlachomitros signed a one-year loan deal with Serbian SuperLiga side FK Javor Ivanjica. At the beginning of 2017, the deal was terminated and Vlachomitros returned to his home club without official caps for Javor.

Personal life
Vlachomitros' younger brother, Anestis, is also a professional footballer.

Honours
AEK Athens
Football League 2: 2013–14 (6th Group)
Greek Cup: 2015–16
Ionikos
Super League Greece 2: 2020–21

References

External links
 Andreas Vlachomitros at AEK official website
 Andreas Vlachomitros at SuperLeague Greece official website

1997 births
Living people
Footballers from Athens
Greek footballers
Association football forwards
AEK Athens F.C. players
Super League Greece players
FK Javor Ivanjica players
Greek expatriate footballers
Expatriate footballers in Serbia
Apollon Pontou FC players
A.E. Sparta P.A.E. players
Aiginiakos F.C. players
Ionikos F.C. players
Niki Volos F.C. players
Greek expatriate sportspeople in Serbia